Since 2005, the Chinese Professional Baseball League (CPBL) recognizes hold champions in each season.  Because of the nature of a hold, the award is typically awarded to middle relievers or setup pitchers.  If players' holds are equal, the player with the better ERA statistic is awarded.

Champions

External links

Chinese Professional Baseball League lists
Chinese Professional Baseball League awards